The San José Lagoon (Spanish: Laguna de San José) is a shallow saline lake or lagoon located between the municipalities of San Juan and Carolina in northern Puerto Rico. Despite being located in a highly urbanized area this body of water is important for its mangrove forests. The lagoon is located between San Juan and the island's main airport and a bridge that connects the two was opened in 1994.

Ecology 
The lagoon is of ecological importance due to the mangrove forests that grow on its shores which are home to numerous benthic species of flora and fauna. This ecosystem has been threatened due to the fast urbanization of San Juan and its urban area. Some of the fish species found in the lagoon are tarpon, ladyfish, and the common snook (Centropomus undecimalis). Green iguanas and alligators, which are invasive species in the region, are also common in the area.

See also 
 Condado Lagoon
 San Juan Bay

References 

Bodies of water of Puerto Rico
Santurce, San Juan, Puerto Rico
Carolina, Puerto Rico
San Juan, Puerto Rico
Lagoons of the United States